Mousadhi Bag is a politician from Odisha in India. He is currently serving as Member of Legislative Assembly of Dharmagarh after being elected in the 2019 Odisha Legislative Assembly election.

Early life
Mr. Bag born in 1960 to Keshab Bag in a Hindu Gopal (Yadav) family of Majhiguda village (Kalahandi).

References

Living people
People from Kalahandi district
Odisha politicians
Biju Janata Dal politicians
Odisha MLAs 2019–2024
1960 births